Juan Eduardo Hohberg (8 October 1926 – 30 April 1996) was an Argentine-born Uruguayan football player and coach. He is best remembered as a player for Peñarol (1949-59) where he won 6 Uruguayan Primera División title wins (1949, 1951, 1953, 1954, 1958, 1959), and for playing for Uruguay at the 1954 FIFA World Cup - where Uruguay finished 4th. He was also Manager (coach) of Uruguay at the 1970 World Cup - they finished 4th

He is the grandfather of Peruvian footballer Alejandro Hohberg.

Club career

Hohberg started his playing career in 1946 with Central Córdoba before joining Rosario Central in 1947.

In 1948 Hohberg moved to Uruguay to join  Peñarol where he would play until 1959. Peñarol won six league titles during his time with the club.

Towards the end of his playing career he had spells with Racing Club de Montevideo and Cúcuta Deportivo in Colombia.

International career
Hohberg scored three goals as a forward for the Uruguay national football team in the 1954 FIFA World Cup in Switzerland, including two in one of the most exciting World Cup matches ever played, the semi-final with Hungary. His second goal in the 86th minute of that match sent the game into extra time, where Hungary finally prevailed 4-2 after two goals by Sándor Kocsis.

Coaching career
Hohberg was Uruguay's coach at the 1970 FIFA World Cup in Mexico, leading them to a fourth-place finish.

In Peru, he coached Universitario de Deportes winning the Peruvian championship in 1974, and Alianza Lima who won the title in 1977 and 1978. Also, was trainer of Deportivo Municipal.

Personal life
The Peruvian footballer Alejandro Hohberg is his grandson.

Career statistics

International

Scores and results list Uruguay's goal tally first, score column indicates score after each Hohberg goal.

References

External links

  

1926 births
1996 deaths
Association football forwards
Uruguayan footballers
Uruguay international footballers
Argentine footballers
1954 FIFA World Cup players
Central Córdoba de Rosario footballers
Rosario Central footballers
Peñarol players
Racing Club de Montevideo players
Cúcuta Deportivo footballers
Uruguayan Primera División players
Argentine Primera División players
Categoría Primera A players
Expatriate footballers in Colombia
Expatriate footballers in Uruguay
Expatriate football managers in Ecuador
Expatriate football managers in Peru
Uruguayan football managers
1970 FIFA World Cup managers
Club Universitario de Deportes managers
Club Alianza Lima managers
Juan Aurich managers
Deportivo Municipal managers
Argentine football managers
Uruguay national football team managers
Peñarol managers
Argentine people of German descent
Ecuador national football team managers
Cúcuta Deportivo managers
L.D.U. Quito managers
Footballers from Córdoba, Argentina
Argentine expatriate sportspeople in Uruguay
Argentine expatriate sportspeople in Colombia
C.A. Bella Vista managers